Augustine Kpehe Ngafuan (born April 7, 1970) served from 2012 to 2015 as the Minister of Foreign Affairs of Liberia, in the administration of President Ellen Johnson-Sirleaf. Ngafuan was Minister of Finance for Liberia during Johnson-Sirleaf's first term, and was then appointed to his post at the Ministry of Foreign Affairs on January 17, 2012. He took office on February 10, 2012, succeeding Toga McIntosh.

See also
Foreign relations of Liberia

References

External links 
Ministry of Foreign Affairs, Liberia

University of Rochester alumni
1970 births
Living people
Politicians from Monrovia
University of Liberia alumni
Foreign Ministers of Liberia
Unity Party (Liberia) politicians
Finance Ministers of Liberia